Mekeel McBride (born 1950) is a poet and professor of writing at the University of New Hampshire. She has held fellowships at the Radcliffe Institute for Advanced Study at Harvard University, Princeton University, and the McDowell Colony, as well as being a recipient of two National Endowment for the Arts grants. She is the author of six books of poetry.

Biography 
McBride was born in Pittsburgh, Pennsylvania. She holds a Bachelor's in Arts degree from Mills College in California. She later settled in Kittery, Maine.

McBride has taught at Wheaton College, Berwick Academy, Harvard University, and Princeton University.

After this, McBride began teaching in the Master of Fine Arts writing program at the University of New Hampshire and was also teaching undergraduate classes. She encourages her students to embrace their own creativity, playfulness, and daydreaming, and her classes frequently encourage combining poetry with other kinds of art. For example, to teach students to listen to sound in a different way, McBride has asked students to design a musical instrument and accompany a poem with it; instruments have included crystal glasses filled with water and automobile engines.

Works 

McBride's poems have appeared in publications including The New Yorker, Poetry Field, Seneca Review, Antioch Review, The Nation, Kayak, Virginia Quarterly Review, Ploughshares, and the Georgia Review. Her poem "All Hallows' Eve" was included in the Best American Poetry 1992, Edited by Charles Simic.

Linda Gregerson's review of McBride's 1983 collection The Going Under of the Evening Land,, wrote that "At their best, McBride's negotiations between expectation and creative license achieve an exquisite balance."

David Gruber, reviewing her compendium Dog Star Delicatessen, described her "ongoing, underlying resistance to the constraints of normative lyrical language" and said "I believe there is a great beauty and humanity at work in McBride’s poetry. Her work offers us a world in which the ordinary can give way to the transcendent, if we will allow it to." He also likened her themes to Elizabeth Bishop's ("Like Bishop, McBride sees animals as fellow sufferers along with humanity here on earth.")

Collections
Dog Star Delicatessen: New and Selected Poems, 1979-2006, 2006
The Deepest Part of the River, 2001
Red Letter Days, 1998
Wind of the White Dresses, 1995
The Going Under of the Evening Land, 1983
No Ordinary World, 1979

References

Notes

21st-century American poets
American women poets
University of New Hampshire faculty
Poets from Maine
Poets from New Hampshire
Mills College alumni
People from Kittery, Maine
Writers from Pittsburgh
Living people
1950 births
American women academics
21st-century American women writers